The Fussball Club Basel 1893 1989–90 season was their 96th season since the club's foundation. Charles Röthlisberger was the club's chairman for the second consecutive year. FC Basel played their home games in the St. Jakob Stadium. Following their relegation in the 1987–88 season this was their second season in the second tier of Swiss football.

Overview

Pre-season
For the third consecutive season Urs Siegenthaler was first team coach. After missing promotion the season before the club's repeated priority aim was to return to the top flight of Swiss football. Due to the poor results during October Urs Siegenthaler lost his position as first team coach and in November he was replaced by Ernst August Künnecke. 

As was previously noted during the off-season period over the previous few years, again this season there were many changes in the squad. Remo Brügger, who had recovered from his car accident injuries, moved on to St. Gallen. This was in a player swop with goalkeeper pendant Thomas Grüter who did not want to return there, following his six-month loan with Basel, following Brügger's accident. Michael Syfrig moved on to higher tier Aarau and Lucio Esposito also moved on to a higher-tier club, Bellinzona. Seven other players left the squad because their contracts had not been renewed.

In the other direction Erni Maissen returned from Young Boys. Ruedi Zbinden returned to the club and Sascha Reich signed in from Bellinzona. Miodrag Đurđević was taken on contrcat from Dinamo Zagreb and Uwe Wassmer from Schalke 04. Further there were the signings of young local newcomers, like Manfred Wagner from FC Steinen-Höllstein, Vittorio Gottardi from SC Dornach, Jörg Heuting from Concordia Basel and René Spicher from Old Boys. Other newcomers were Olaf Berg from Viktoria Buchholz and Boris Mancastroppa from Red Star Zürich.

Domestic league
The 24 teams in the Nationalliga B were divided into two groups, an east and a west group, to first play a qualification round. In the second stage the tops six teams in each group and the last four team of the Nationalliga A would play a promotion/relegation round, also divided into two groups. The top two teams in each group would play in the top flight the next season. Basel were assigned to the West group. The Qualifying Phase started well and after ten rounds with six victories and only one defeat Basel led the group. Then however, a run of bad results, including home defeats against lower positioned teams ES Malley and Etoile Carouge and a 4–0 dubbing away against Yverdon-Sports cost head-coach Urs Siegenthaler his job. The team ended their 22 matches in the Qualifying Phase with 11 victories, five draws and six defeats with 27 points in a disappointing fifth position in the league table. The team scored just 29 goals and conceded 27. Erni Maissen was the team's top scorer in this stage with 10 goals, including a hat-trick, scored within seven minutes, during the away game against Old Boys on 22 September.

Basel qualified for the promotion stage and were assigned to group A. Also assigned into this group from the Nationalliga B were Zürich, Yverdon-Sports, Fribourg, Chur and Schaffhausen. These were joined by two teams from the Nationalliga A, Servette and Bellinzona, who were fighting against relegation. Basel started well, winning the first four matches, but could only manage draws at home against both Servette and Zürich. The return matches against these two teams both ended in defeats and thus Basel could only reach third position in the table behind these two rivals and thus missed promotion.

Swiss Cup
Basel entered into the Swiss Cup in the 2nd principal round. Here they were drawn away against lower tier FC Moutier. The game was won convincingly 8–0 with seven different goal scorers. In the third round they were drawn against lower tier SC Burgdorf and this won easily (3–0) as well. In the round of 32 they were drawn away against Schaffhausen. Despite an early red card for Miodrag Đurđević, the match ended with a 1–0 victory. In the next round Basel had an away game against Bulle and mastered this with a 6–0 victory. Basel advanced through the first four rounds without conceding a single goal and had scored 18, with 11 different goal scorers. However, in the quarterfinals Basels cup season came to an end after a 0–1 defeat away from home in the Hardturm Stadium against higher tier Grasshopper Club. The Grasshoppers went on to win the trophy, for the third season in a row, beating Xamax 2–1 in the final. In fact the Grasshoppers achieved the national double that season.

Players 

 
 

 

 
 

 

 
 

 
 
 

 

Players who left the squad

Results 
Legend

Friendly matches

Pre-season

Winter break and mid-season

Nationalliga B

Qualifying Phase West

League table

Promotion/relegation Phase

League table

Swiss Cup

See also 
 History of FC Basel
 List of FC Basel players
 List of FC Basel seasons

References

Sources 
 Rotblau: Jahrbuch Saison 2015/2016. Publisher: FC Basel Marketing AG. 
 Die ersten 125 Jahre. Publisher: Josef Zindel im Friedrich Reinhardt Verlag, Basel. 
 The FCB squad 1989–90 at fcb-archiv.ch
 1989–90 at RSSSF

External links
 FC Basel official site

FC Basel seasons
Basel